Interstate 635 may refer to:
 Interstate 635 (Kansas–Missouri), a connector highway between Interstate 35 in Overland Park, Kansas and Interstate 29 in Kansas City, Missouri, signed as the Harry Darby Memorial Highway
 Interstate 635 (Texas), a partial loop around Dallas, Texas also signed as the LBJ Freeway

35-6
6